Edmond-Paris Maghoma (born 8 May 2001) is an English professional footballer who plays as a central midfielder for  club Milton Keynes Dons, on loan from  club Brentford. He is a product of the Tottenham Hotspur academy and was capped by England at youth level.

Club career

Tottenham Hotspur 
A central midfielder, Maghoma began his career in the academy at Tottenham Hotspur. He progressed to sign a scholarship deal at the end of the 2016–17 season and progressed through the club's U18 team to the Development Squad. Maghoma made two appearances and scored one goal during the U21 team's 2018–19 EFL Trophy campaign. He departed White Hart Lane in January 2020.

Brentford 
On 16 January 2020, Maghoma signed an 18-month contract the B team at Championship club Brentford for an undisclosed fee. In what remained of the 2019–20 season, he made 10 appearances and scored one goal. Maghoma was included in the first team group for the 2020–21 pre-season and was an unused substitute on the opening day of the regular season. At the end of an injury hit 2020–21 season, he signed a new one-year contract, with the option of a further year. Maghoma returned fit for the 2021–22 pre-season and with the first team now playing Premier League football, a midfield injury crisis saw him win a number of first team call-ups between October and December 2021. On 10 January 2022, it was announced that he had signed a new -year contract. Maghoma was a part of the B team's 2021–22 London Senior Cup-winning squad and was promoted into the first team squad at the end of the campaign.

In July 2022, Maghoma joined League Two club AFC Wimbledon on loan for the duration of the 2022–23 season. He made the first competitive appearance of his career on the opening day of the season, with a start in a 2–0 victory over Gillingham. Following 24 appearances, Maghoma was sidelined by an ankle injury suffered in training in mid-December, which led to his recall from the loan on 5 January 2023. 18 days later, he joined League One club Milton Keynes Dons on loan until the end of the 2022–23 season.

International career 
Maghoma was capped by England at U15, U16, U18, U19 and U20 levels.

Personal life 
Maghoma grew up in Finchley and attended Finchley Catholic High School. He is of DR Congo descent and his brothers Jacques and Christian are both footballers.

Career statistics

Honours 
Brentford B

 London Senior Cup: 2021–22

Individual

 Tournoi Européen de Baisieux Player of the Tournament: 2018

References

External links 

 
 Paris Maghoma at brentfordfc.com

2001 births
Living people
English footballers
Black British sportspeople
Association football midfielders
Footballers from Enfield, London
English people of Democratic Republic of the Congo descent
Brentford F.C. players
AFC Wimbledon players
English Football League players
England youth international footballers
Milton Keynes Dons F.C. players